Sarah Woodin is an American biologist currently at University of South Carolina and an Elected Fellow of the American Association for the Advancement of Science.

References

Year of birth missing (living people)
Living people
Fellows of the American Association for the Advancement of Science
University of South Carolina faculty
21st-century American biologists